Carabus validus, is a species of ground beetle in the large genus Carabus.

References 

validus
Insects described in 1884